"Fanfare for the Common Man" is an instrumental piece of music adapted and played by the English progressive rock band Emerson, Lake & Palmer, from the group's 1977 Works Volume I album. Adapted by Keith Emerson from Aaron Copland's 1942 piece of the same name, it is one of their most popular and enduring pieces.

Background
ELP had previously adapted Copland's "Hoedown" for the band's Trilogy album in 1972. Although ELP did not always initially attribute the classical source for some of their pieces (only attributed in later releases of the albums), Copland was attributed as the source for both Hoedown and Fanfare. Unlike Bartók and Janáček, Copland was still alive at the time of the recording.

According to Keith Emerson,

Production
Greg Lake remembers the first time ELP played the adaptation:

In another interview, Lake remarks:

While in Montreal, during their 1977 tour of America, the band was rehearsing in the basement of the Olympic stadium, the only space available sufficiently large to accommodate themselves and the orchestra. During a coffee break, Lake took the lift upstairs, and was struck by the spectacle of the empty stadium under a carpet of snow, and was inspired to hold a jam session in the unique environment. They organized for their equipment to be set up early the following morning, and a video recordist to document the proceedings.
Despite the extreme cold, the trio, dressed in their warmest gear, completed a version of Fanfare in four separate "takes", filming each member individually, then one of the trio which, assembled, is available on several "free to view" services: Youtube and Dailymotion

Comparison to original
Emerson's adaptation begins very much the same as Copland's original piece, though at a slightly faster tempo, up to about the thirty-second mark, where a strong rhythm line from drums, bass and Emerson on the lower rank of the GX-1 begins. From that point, Emerson restates the theme before starting the modal solo (on the GX-1's solo rank) that so bewildered Copland at about the three-minute mark, returning to the main theme at the eight-minute mark.

There is some ambiguity as to whether real trumpets or the Yamaha GX-1 was used for the introductory trumpet part. Anecdotal evidence suggests it was the GX-1. When performed on some of the Works Live tour, Fanfare began and ended with real trumpets but the liner notes for the album Works Volume I show only the three band members and no other performers on that track.

Reactions from Copland
Stewart Young, ELP's manager from 1972–present, made this comment on the documentary Beyond the Beginning:

In an interview with Melissa Merli of The News-Gazette, Emerson said: "I know that Aaron Copland for one admired my adaptation. The BBC radio people in England interviewed him shortly before he passed and got his opinion, and it was very complimentary."

In a BBC Radio interview, Copland relayed his reaction to the piece:

Personnel
Keith Emerson: Yamaha GX1 polyphonic synthesizer
Greg Lake: 8-string Alembic bass
Carl Palmer: timpanis, drums

Versions
An edited version, closer to Copland's original three minutes, was released May 1977 as a single and became ELP's most popular release, reaching number 2 in the UK Singles Chart. The "B" side of the single was the song Brain Salad Surgery, recorded during the sessions for the album of the same name but not released until Works Volume 2.

From the booklet that accompanies the Emerson, Lake & Palmer: Welcome Back My Friends, 40th Anniversary Reunion Concert DVD:

The compilations The Return of the Manticore, The Ultimate Collection, From the Beginning, Fanfare for the Common Man - Anthology, Come and See the Show - The Best of Emerson Lake & Palmer and The Very Best of Emerson, Lake & Palmer feature the full version but the compilation The Best of Emerson, Lake & Palmer includes the single version. The Essential Emerson, Lake & Palmer contains a third version, running five minutes and forty seconds.

On the live recording Emerson, Lake and Palmer in Concert (later released as Works Live), the performance begins and ends with the orchestra that the band took with them for some of the 1977 tour supporting the release of the Works Volume 1 album.

ELP is also known to combine their rendition of Fanfare with other pieces, such as during their performances Live at the Royal Albert Hall and Live in Poland, which end with a piece titled "Finale" or "Medley" that contains Fanfare and adaptations called America (based on America by Leonard Bernstein and Stephen Sondheim) and/or Rondo (based on Blue Rondo à la Turk by Dave Brubeck), both of which were played by Emerson when he was in the band The Nice.

Performances by ELP and by others
This arrangement was an opening theme song for the CBS Sports Spectacular.  It is also used by Australia's Seven Network as a theme song for their sports programmes. It was also used in the 1993 Valvoline 200 during the intro segment.

Fanfare became a staple of ELP's concerts  and, while the opening and closing portions of the piece follow the recorded version fairly closely, Emerson's "modal" solo varied from one performance to another.

Fanfare has also been performed by the band members in other bands, including:

Emerson performed Fanfare in 1990 with John Entwistle, Joe Walsh, Jeff "Skunk" Baxter and Simon Phillips on tour in Japan as the supergroup The Best; with his old band The Nice in Glasgow on a tour in 2002; at the Ahmet Ertegun Tribute Concert in 2007 with Yes band members Chris Squire and Alan White; and most recently with the Keith Emerson Band.
Emerson and Palmer performed it together in concert as part of the band 3 with Robert Berry on guitar, but not on the band's 1988 release To the Power of Three.
Emerson and Lake performed Fanfare in concert as part of the band Emerson, Lake & Powell, but not on the band's self-titled studio album. 
Lake also performed Fanfare in concert but with none of the other original members performing.
Palmer has performed Fanfare in concert, including a reunion concert with Asia, with Geoff Downes on keyboards, Steve Howe on guitar and John Wetton on bass and with an Asia spin-off called Qango. Most recently, Palmer has presented a show entitled Carl Palmer & His Band – Celebrates The Music of Emerson Lake & Palmer, which features a version of Fanfare, amongst other ELP pieces. Palmer's band consists of himself on drums, guitarist Paul Bielatowicz and bassist Simon Fitzpatrick.
Emerson worked with producer Mike Bennett on Reworks: Brain Salad Perjury in 2007, which consists of remixes of ELP songs, including two versions of Fanfare.

An ELP tribute act called Fanfare includes Fanfare for the Common Man in their shows.

Italian organist Marco Lo Muscio has performed an arrangement of Emerson's adaptation of Fanfare on numerous church organs

Charts

Weekly charts

Year-end charts

Certifications

References

External links 
Emerson, Lake & Palmer official
Keith Emerson official
Greg Lake official
Carl Palmer official

Single chart usages for UK
Single chart called without artist
Single chart called without song
Single chart making named ref

Emerson, Lake & Palmer songs
1977 songs
Rock instrumentals
1970s instrumentals
Compositions by Aaron Copland